Allan McKeown (21 May 1946 – 24 December 2013), was a British television and stage producer.

Early life
McKeown was born in Ealing, London on 21 May 1946. His parents Edith Mabel (née Humphries) and Albert Victor McKeown moved first to Hackney and then to Hainault, Essex. His father was the Clerk of Works at the new estate. Educated at Beal Grammar school in Ilford, he left early and became a trainee hairdresser at Vidal Sassoon in Bond Street. He was a figure in the London scene of the 1960s, and in 1966 he opened his own salon. As a hairdresser, he worked on the TV show Sunday Night at the London Palladium and the films if.... (1968), Villain and Get Carter (both 1971).

Television producer
In 1969, he changed course and became a producer at James Garrett and Partners, at the time the largest TV commercials producer in the UK. He was appointed Managing Director shortly after joining. He left to form a production company Witzend with Dick Clement and Ian La Frenais. Initially making commercials, then the feature film Porridge (US: Doing Time, 1979). McKeown was the executive producer for Central Television's  Auf Wiedersehen, Pet, with Clement and La Frenais as the show's main writers.

He was one of the first independent television producers in the UK. McKeown not only produced in Britain with his company, WitzEnd, but also produced in the US for all of the networks. In 1986, Witzend acquired Selectv, and in the process became a public company. The company grew as it added Alomo, a venture with writers Laurence Marks and Maurice Gran to its stable of production companies. In 1990, McKeown was a founding member of the Meridian consortium. The consortium was awarded the ITV television franchise for the South East of England.

McKeown was responsible for all of Meridian's comedy programming. In 1994 Selectv (the cable channel) was launched its programming, mainly programs produced by McKeown. In March 1996, McKeown accepted £51 million for SelecTV, now a broadcaster and a major supplier of television programs, from Pearson, then owner of the Financial Times. McKeown returned to the US producing the HBO comedy series, Tracey Takes On... for wife, Tracey Ullman. The series won six Emmy Awards. McKeown invested in the media launching web site itstv.com, an international distribution web site. The company was sold in March 2000. In 2007, McKeown launched Allan McKeown Presents, Ltd. The company produced the Indian comedy series, Mumbai Calling as well as Tracey Ullman's State of the Union (2008–10).

Stage
McKeown was involved in the West End production of Anyone For Denis? (Whitehall Theatre, 1981) via Witzend Productions, and the Broadway show, The Big Love in 1991, a one-woman show starring Ullman. He produced the highly successful Jerry Springer: The Opera, winning an Olivier Award for Best Musical.  He also produced Lennon, a musical based on the life of John Lennon.

Personal life
McKeown and Tracey Ullman married in 1983.  They had two children and lived in both England and the United States. In 2006, McKeown and Ullman topped the "Wealthiest British Comedians" list, with an estimated net worth of £75 million.

Death
McKeown died on Christmas Eve 24 December 2013 at the age of 67 in Los Angeles, California, from prostate cancer.

Filmography

Television

Film

Theatre

References

External links
 
 
 Allan McKeown - obituary - The Telegraph
 Allan John McKeown Memorial Tribute

1946 births
2013 deaths
Emmy Award winners
English television producers
English film producers
Deaths from prostate cancer
Deaths from cancer in California
People from the London Borough of Ealing
20th-century English businesspeople